Kosher salt or kitchen salt (also called cooking salt, flake salt, rock salt, kashering salt or koshering salt) is coarse edible salt without common additives such as iodine. Typically used in cooking and not at the table, it consists mainly of sodium chloride and may include anticaking agents.

Etymology
Coarse edible salt is a kitchen staple, but its name varies widely in various cultures and countries. The term kosher salt gained common usage in North America and refers to its use in the Jewish religious practice of dry brining meats, known as kashering, and not to the salt itself being manufactured under any religious guidelines. Some brands further identify kosher-certified salt as being approved by a religious body.

Usage

General cooking
Due to the lack of metallic or off-tasting additives such as iodine, fluoride or dextrose, it is often used in the kitchen instead of additive-containing table salt. Estimating the amount of salt when salting by hand can also be easier due to the larger grain size. Some recipes specifically call for volume measurement of kosher/kitchen salt, which for some brands weighs less per measure due to its lower density and is therefore less salty than an equal volume measurement of table salt; recipes which call for a specified weight of salt are more consistent. Different brands of salt vary dramatically in density; for one brand the same volume measure may contain twice as much salt (by mass) as for another brand.

Brining or kashering meat

The coarse-grained salt is used to create a dry brine, which increases succulence and flavor and satisfies some religious requirements, sometimes with flavor additions such as herbs, spices or sugar. The meat is typically soaked in cool water and drained and then completely covered with a thin layer of salt—and then allowed to stand on a rack or board for an hour or more. The larger salt granules remain on the surface of the meat, for the most part undissolved, and absorb fluids from the meat, which are then partially reabsorbed with the salt and any added flavors, essentially brining the meat in its own juices. The salt rub is then rinsed off and discarded before cooking.

Cleaning
Due to its grain size, the salt is also used as an abrasive cleaner for cookware such as cast iron skillets. Mixed with oil, it retains its abrasiveness but can be easily dissolved with water after cleaning, unlike cleansers based on pumice or calcium carbonate, which can leave a gritty residue if not thoroughly rinsed away.

Manufacturing 
Rather than cubic crystals, kosher salt has a flat plate-like shape and for some brands may also have a hollow pyramidal shape. Morton Salt produces flat kosher salt while Diamond Crystal produces pyramidal. The flat form is usually made when cubic crystals are forced into this shape under pressure, usually between rollers. The pyramidal salt crystals are generally made by an evaporative process called the Alberger process. Kosher salt is usually manufactured with a grain size larger than table salt grains. Diamond Crystal salt is made by Cargill in St. Clair, MI and Morton Salt is from Chicago, IL.

See also

References 

Edible salt
Kosher food